The World Junior Girls Championship is an annual world amateur team golf championship for women under 18 organized in Canada. The inaugural event was held in 2014.

Format
The competition is open to female juniors who have not reached their 19th birthday by the last scheduled day of the championship, and who are not playing university or college golf. 20 Countries with 3 girls per team compete over 72 hole stroke play in a team and individual competition.

Results

Source:

Results summary

Team tournament

See also
Junior Golf World Cup

References

External links
Pasts results on the World Junior Girls Championship's site

Amateur golf tournaments
Team golf tournaments
Junior golf tournaments
Golf tournaments in Ontario
Recurring sporting events established in 2014